The 2015 Melbourne Football Club season was the club's 116th year in the VFL/AFL since it began in 1897.

Despite improvements in 2014, Melbourne still produced a poor season in regards to results, which led to Melbourne receiving a financially and commercially challenging draw. Games were broadcast on the Seven Network (free to air) for seven games, down from nine in 2014.

Even with financial and commercial challenges, the club continued to host its annual Queen's Birthday clash against Collingwood in round 10 and played its first Friday night game since round 7, 2012, which was against  in round 4 as a lead into ANZAC day. The club also played more traditional time slots, as the AFL aimed to have a more 'fan friendly' fixture, with seventeen day games (up from twelve), two twilight matches (down from five) and three at night (down from five). In addition, the club played 17 matches in Victoria, and traveled to Adelaide, Canberra, and Perth once, and the Northern Territory twice.

Melbourne sold two of its home games to the Northern Territory due to a sponsorship deal made with Tourism NT. One was at TIO Traeger Park in Alice Springs in round 9 against  for the second year in a row. The other match was at TIO Stadium in Darwin for the sixth year in a row, which was against  in round 14. In addition Melbourne hosted Greater Western Sydney at Etihad Stadium in round 23.

The club finished the season with 7 wins and 15 losses, this was the club's best result since the 2011 season.

2015 list changes

2014 free agency

2014 trades

Retirements and delistings

National draft

Rookie draft

2015 squad

2015 season

Pre-season

NAB Challenge

Week 1

Week 2

Week 3

Home and away season

Round 1

Round 2

Round 3

Round 4

Round 5

Round 6

Round 7

Round 8

Round 9

Round 10

Round 11

Round 12

Round 13

Round 14

Round 15

Round 16

Round 17

Round 18

Round 19

Round 20

Round 21

Round 22

Round 23

Ladder

Ladder breakdown by opposition

Tribunal/Match Review Panel cases

Awards

Brownlow Medal tally

Keith 'Bluey' Truscott Medal tally (top 10)

Keith 'Bluey' Truscott Trophy – Bernie Vince

Sid Anderson Memorial Trophy (Second in the Best and Fairest) – Jack Viney

Ron Barassi Snr Memorial Trophy (Third in the Best and Fairest) – Tom McDonald

Ivor Warne-Smith Memorial Trophy (Fourth in the Best and Fairest) – Jesse Hogan

Dick Taylor Memorial Trophy (Fifth in the Best and Fairest) – Nathan Jones

Harold Ball Memorial Trophy (Best Young Player) – Jesse Hogan

Troy Broadbridge Trophy (highest polling MFC player in the Casey Best and Fairest) – Aidan Riley

Ron Barassi Jnr. Leadership Award – Daniel Cross, Jack Trengove

Ian Ridley Club Ambassador Award – Neville Jetta

Norm Smith Memorial Trophy (Coach's Award) – Jack Viney

James McDonald Trophy (Best Team Man) – Jack Viney

Leading Goalkicker Award – Jesse Hogan (44 goals)

Best Female Player – Daisy Pearce

References

External links
 Official Website of the Melbourne Football Club
 Official Website of the AFL 

2015
Melbourne Football Club